Dežno may refer to one of two places in Slovenia:
 Dežno pri Makolah
 Dežno pri Podlehniku